Pierre-Claver Akendengué (born April 25, 1943) is a Gabonese musician and composer. In 1997, he received his country's "Prix d'excellence" at the Africa Music awards in Libreville, honoring his body of work.  He also serves as a cultural advisor for the government of Gabon.

Biography
Born on the island of Awuta, which is located just off the coast from Port-Gentil, Akendengué went to school in Port-Gentil, then studied psychology at the University of Caen in France during the 1960s. While in France, he met the singer Mireille, who encouraged his musical interests.

In 1974, Akendengué recorded his first album, Nandipo, which consisted of songs of his own composition, sung in French and Nkomi, accompanied by guitar, women choir, bass and the percussion of Nana Vasconcelos. He later set to music poems by P. E. Mondjegou, such as "Le Chant du Coupeur d'Okoumé" ("The Song of the Okoumé Cutter"). Returning to Gabon, he studied solfeggio and plainchant at a Catholic college, and presented spectacles showcasing traditional Gabonese forms in a concert setting.

In 1986, he received a doctorate from the University of Paris for his study of religion and education among the Nkomi.

Discography
 1974 Nandipo
 1976 Africa Obota
 1978 Eseringuila
 1979 Owende
 1980 Mengo
 1982 Awana W'Afrika
 1983 Mando
 1984 Réveil de l'Afrique
 1986 Piroguier
 1986 Sarraouinia
 1988 Espoir à Soweto
 1990 Silence
 1993 Lambarena
 1995 Maladadite
 1996 Carrefour Rio
 2000 Obakadences
 2004 Ekunda-Sah
 2005 Gorée
 2009 La Verité d'Afrique
 2013 Destinée
 2018 La couleur de l´Afrique

References

External links
"CD of the Week: Pierre Akendengué – Ekunda-Sah!", RFI Music, March 25, 2005.  Accessed January 24, 2006  	
Pierre Akendengue – Gorée

1943 births
Living people
Gabonese composers
University of Caen Normandy alumni
People from Ogooué-Maritime Province
Gabonese singers
21st-century Gabonese people